Eyshabad (also Romanized as ‘Eyshābād and ‘Aishābād; also known as Gūrābād and ‘Isáābād) is a village in Azadegan Rural District, in the Central District of Rafsanjan County, Kerman Province, Iran. At the 2006 census, its population was 1,112, in 280 families.

References 

Populated places in Rafsanjan County